This is a listing of the horses that finished in either first, second, or third place and the number of starters in the Breeders' Cup Dirt Mile, a grade one race run on dirt held on Saturday of the Breeders' Cup World Thoroughbred Championships.

References

External links
 Breeders' Cup official website

Dirt Mile
Lists of horse racing results